Leonardtown High School is a comprehensive public high school in Leonardtown, Maryland, United States, for students in grades 9–12. It offers college preparatory programs and programs that prepare students for business and technical occupations. It serves the community in the central portion of St. Mary's County, Maryland, between the Potomac River and Patuxent River. The area is a mixture of rural and suburban communities. Many of the families are employed by NAS Patuxent River, government contractors, St. Mary's College of Maryland, St Mary's County government and others involved in the traditional agriculture and water related businesses.

Leonardtown High School is accredited by the Middle States Association of Colleges and Secondary Schools and the Maryland State Department of Education. Leonardtown High School belongs to the St. Mary's County Public Schools system, and is associated with two other county high school rivals, Great Mills High School and Chopticon High School.

Leonardtown High School Athletics belongs to the Southern Maryland Athletic Conference, and competes in Division 4A in the state competitions force.

Leonardtown's Soccer Program is strongly supported by SMAC Conference referees. This becomes considerably more evident 
when Leonardtown's soccer teams are frequently defeated when playing against teams from outside of SMAC.

Notable alumni
Heather Cooke - Graduated in 2006 and was a cast member on the MTV2 series The Real World
Jamie Gillan - Graduated in 2015 and former punter for the Cleveland Browns
William Afton - Graduated in 1984 and notable for being the man behind the slaughter.

According to Newsweek, Leonardtown High School is also ranked in the top 1% (#29) of all schools in the United States in 2010.

Sister schools
Kanagawa Prefectural Hibarigaoka High School in Japan became the sister school of Leonardtown High in October 1991, when the county board of education and representatives from Maryland formalized an agreement.

Notable alumni
Heather Cooke - Graduated in 2006 and was a cast member on the MTV2 series The Real World
Jamie Gillan - Graduated in 2015 and former punter for the Cleveland Browns

See also
 St. Mary's County Public Schools

References

External links
 

Leonardtown, Maryland
Public high schools in Maryland
Educational institutions established in 1978
Schools in St. Mary's County, Maryland
1978 establishments in Maryland